The 1882–83 Scottish Cup – officially the Scottish Football Association Challenge Cup – was the tenth season of Scotland's most prestigious football knockout competition. Dumbarton won the cup for the first, and so far only, time when they beat Vale of Leven 2–1 in a replayed final.

Defending champions Queen's Park were knock-out by eventual winners Dumbarton in the quarter-finals.

Calendar

As with the previous competitions, the eighth edition of the Scottish Cup took on the format of a traditional knockout tournament. For the earlier rounds, the names of competing teams were placed into lots according to their districts and drawn into pairs. The home team for each tie was determined by the toss of a coin unless it was mutually agreed or only one of the two clubs drawn against one another had a private ground. In the event of a draw, the team who lost the toss would have the choice of ground for the replay. A similar procedure was used for subsequent rounds however, any club which had received a bye in the previous round would first be drawn against one of the winners of the previous round. The names of winning teams were placed into one lot for later rounds. The choice of venue for the final matches was reserved to the Scottish Football Association.

Both Glasgow and Edinburgh Universities were given byes to the third round.
Four teams qualified for the second round after drawing their first round replay.
Two teams qualified for the third round after drawing their second round replay.
Two teams qualified for the fourth round after drawing their third round second replay.

Teams
All 125 teams entered the competition in the first round.

First round
Apsley, Aberdeen, King's Park, Queen of the South Wanderers and Vale of Leven received a bye to the second round. Glasgow University and Edinburgh University received a bye to the third round.

Matches

Replays

Notes

Sources:

Second round
Falkirk received a bye to the third round.

Matches

Replays

Notes

Sources:

Third round
Edinburgh University, Glasgow University, Hibernian and Hurlford received a bye to the fourth round.

Matches

Replays

Second replay

Notes

Sources:

Fourth round

Matches

Replay

Sources:

Fifth Round
Dumbarton, Kilmarnock Athletic, Partick Thistle, Pollokshields Athletic and 3rd Lanark RV received a bye to the quarter-finals.

Matches

Replays

Sources:

Quarter-finals

Matches

Replays

Second replay

Third replay

Sources:

Semi-finals

Matches

Replays

Sources:

Final

Replay

See also
1882–83 in Scottish football

References

Cup
Scottish Cup seasons
Scot